Wheat Thins is a brand of baked whole grain snack food crackers distributed in the United States and Canada by Mondelez International. The product is also available in Australia through wholesaler USA Foods. Vegetable Thins, Oat Thins, Pita Thins, and Rice Thins, which are all spinoffs of Wheat Thins, are available in Canada and some regions of the United States. Wheat Thins themselves come in many flavors and varieties. Nabisco first introduced the product in 1947.

Advertising 
The introduced recent commercial aired during The Simpsons episode ''Rednecks and Broomsticks'' featuring Brian and Stewie from the animated sitcom Family Guy, in which Stewie puts emphasis on the "H" in "Wheat," saying instead, "Hwheat Thins." Other recent marketing for the brand has focused on targeting younger consumers by giving away products at youth-oriented events such as college football games, and heavily utilizing social media.

Nutrition information
The following is nutrition information for Wheat Thins original.

Varieties 
There are several varieties available, depending on country and market:

 Artisan cheese: Wisconsin Colby
 Artisan cheese: Vermont White Cheddar
 Big
 Chipotle
 Dill Pickle
 Fiber Selects 5-Grain
 Flatbread Garlic & Parsley
 Flatbread Tuscan Herb
 Hint of Salt
 Honey Mustard
 Lime (limited time 2013)
 Multigrain
 Original
 Popped – a popped chip variety of Wheat Thins
 Ranch
 Reduced Fat 
 Sour Cream and Onion
 Smoked Gouda
 Smoky BBQ
 Spicy Buffalo
 Sundried Tomato & Basil
 Sweet Onion
 Sweet Potato
 Zesty Salsa

Additional discontinued/changed flavors:

 Baked Snack Reduced Fat
 Cream Cheese & Chives
 Harvest 5-Grain
 Harvest 7-Grain
 Harvest Garden Vegetable
 Honey
 Lightly Cinnamon
 Low Sodium
 Parmesan Basil

See also 

 Mondelēz International
 Kraft Foods

References

Further reading

External links

 

Brand name crackers
Mondelez International brands
Nabisco brands
Products introduced in 2009
Wheat